The Nanjing NJ2045 and NJ2046 is a series of high mobility trucks deployed by the Chinese Army, capable of transporting 1.5 tonne of cargo cross-country. It is a licensed version of the Iveco 40.10WM 4X4 off-road military truck, built by Nanjing Motor Corporation.

The truck entered service in the PLA after 1999.

Weapon platform
 4X4 high-mobility truck
 HJ-9A anti-tank guided missile carrier
 riot control vehicle
 troop carrier

Variants
 10-man (3+3+2X2) 
 11-men (3+4X2)

Operators

  used by People's Liberation Army
  Seen on the State Flag Day parade in 2022
  used by Pakistan Army
  used by Sri Lanka Army Commando Regiment
  used by Dominica Police Force

References

Military trucks of China